Balsamorhiza deltoidea is a species of flowering plant in the sunflower tribe of the plant family Asteraceae known by the common name deltoid balsamroot. It is native to western North America from British Columbia to California, where it grows in many types of generally mountainous habitat.

Description
Balsamorhiza deltoidea is a taprooted perennial herb growing erect to a maximum height near . The stems are hairy and glandular.

The fruit is an achene  in length.

Uses
Deltoid balsamroot has been used as a food and medicinal plant by Native Americans. The seeds were eaten raw or cooked, and sometimes ground up and made into breads or cakes. The roots were also eaten, either raw or cooked, and when roasted make a coffee substitute. Young shoots were also eaten as a fresh green. The roots were also used to treat colds.

References

External links

deltoidea
Flora of British Columbia
Flora of California
Flora of the West Coast of the United States
Flora of the Cascade Range
Flora of the Sierra Nevada (United States)
Natural history of the California chaparral and woodlands
Natural history of the California Coast Ranges
Natural history of the Transverse Ranges
Flora without expected TNC conservation status